Curly: An Illustrated Biography of the Superstooge is a biography of Three Stooges member Jerome (Curly) Howard written by his niece, Joan Howard Maurer.

The book recounts the author's own memories of her uncle, along with interviews with various living relatives, relaying their memories of the rotund Stooge. One of the interviews is with Curly's youngest daughter, Janie Hanky. Interviews with his first daughter, Marilyn, and second wife, Elaine, are also included.

Michael Jackson wrote the foreword to the book.

1985 non-fiction books
American biographies
The Three Stooges
Citadel Press books